The Real Deal is the 21st album released by The Isley Brothers on August 7, 1982. The album is notable for the group's decision to alter their trademark funk rock sound in the 1970s with the then-current early 1980s electro funk scene dominated by Rick James, Prince, Zapp and The Gap Band.

Background

Following the releases of two 1981 albums, the gold-selling Grand Slam and the lesser-successful Inside You, the Isley Brothers were finding themselves in a rut following a successful nine-year run of gold and platinum albums and a succession of hit singles that had made them one of the top-selling R&B/funk bands of the 1970s. After hearing the sounds of the Gap Band and Rick James, The Isleys (Kelly, Rudy, Ron, Ernie and Marvin) and brother-in-law Chris Jasper, whose role in the Isleys had grown to the point where he was adding background vocals himself alongside longtime lead vocalist Ron Isley and also added in a vocoder co-lead while playing synthesizers, which sometimes was overdubbed atop Marvin Isley's bass guitar riffs.

Reception
For their next album, 1982's The Real Deal, the group went for a more minimalist funk sound with the title track, which hit the top 20 of the R&B charts, Ron Isley, Ernie Isley and Chris Jasper showcase "Stone Cold Lover", the vocoderized "Are You With Me", the mid-tempo "It's Alright With Me" (with Chris Jasper being the only other vocalist beside Ron Isley singing on the song) with the smoother pop rock ballad "All in My Lover's Eyes", which peaked at number sixty-seven on the R&B chart in 1983, while Ron and Ernie are showcased heavy on the Jimi Hendrix-inspired "Under the Influence", which showcased a more bluesier approach than the group was used to. Despite hopes that the album will bring the Isleys back to the top of the charts, it stalled at number 87 on the Billboard 200. A year later the group will bounce back with Between the Sheets, which became the last album to feature Chris Jasper. Though younger brothers Ernie and Marvin would also depart, forming Isley-Jasper-Isley with Jasper, they eventually returned to the Isley Brothers fold in 1992 following the death of eldest brother Kelly Isley and the exit of Rudolph Isley. Ronald Isley has since remained the group's most consistent of the members.

Track listing

Personnel
Ronald Isley - Lead and Background vocals
Rudolph Isley - Background vocals 
O'Kelly Isley - Co-lead vocals on "Stone Cold Lover" and Background vocals 
Chris Jasper - Keyboards, Percussion, Vocoder, Co-lead vocals on "It's Alright with Me" and background vocals
Ernie Isley - Drums, Guitar, Percussion, Backing Vocals
Marvin Isley - Bass, Percussion, Backing Vocals
Kevin Jones - Congas
Everett Collins - Drums
Fred Zlotkin, Jonathan Abramowitz - Cello
Fred Buldrini, Gerald Tarrak, Guy Lumia, Harold Kohon, Harry Lookofsky, Marilyn Wright, Winterton Garvey  - Violin
Alfred V. Brown, Mitsue Takayama - Viola

Charts

Singles

Samples
69 Boyz sampled "All In My Lover's Eyes" on their song "Strip Club Luv" on their album The Wait Is Over in 1998.

External links
 The Isley Brothers-The Real Deal at Discogs

References

1982 albums
Boogie albums
The Isley Brothers albums
T-Neck Records albums